Valgus may refer to:
Valgus deformity, an orthopedic deformity
Cubitus valgus, affecting the forearm
Valgus stress, a test for the knee
Valgus (publisher), Estonian publisher
Valgus (newspaper), Estonian newspaper
Valgus (beetle), a genus of beetles
Chalcosyrphus valgus, a species of hoverfly in the family Syrphidae

See also
Valgu (disambiguation)